Virginia's 16th congressional district is an obsolete congressional district.  It was eliminated in 1843 after the 1840 U.S. Census.  Its last Congressman was William A. Harris.

List of members representing the district

References 

 Congressional Biographical Directory of the United States 1774–present

16
Former congressional districts of the United States
Constituencies established in 1793
Constituencies disestablished in 1843
1793 establishments in Virginia
1843 disestablishments in Virginia